The first season of the Australian drama-series Sea Patrol premiered on the Nine Network on 5 July 2007. The 13-episode season concluded 4 October 2007. Set aboard HMAS Hammersley, an old Royal Australian Navy (RAN) patrol boat, the series follows the ship's company as they investigate the deaths of several people who are linked by a web of intrigue.

Filming begun in October 2006 and concluded in February 2007. Most of the material was shot aboard the patrol boat , with up to 60 cast, film crew, and ship's company. They crammed aboard a vessel designed to hold only 24 people in tropical Queensland conditions. Other filming occurred on Dunk Island, in Sydney, and at the Movie World Studios in Queensland.

The show was one of the most eagerly awaited of 2007, with the project marking Lisa McCune's return to television acting. Ratings for the first episode were the second-highest for a drama premiere in Australian history and surpassed the NRL State of Origin match earlier in the week. Initial reviews were mixed, with a concern that the series would be restricted by the early time slot, poor scripts, and clichéd characters and storylines. Critical reception improved as the series progressed, but ratings fell.

Plot
The first season story arc involves the Australian Federal Police's investigation into the death of marine biologist Dr. Lisa Holmes, Kate's relationship with freighter Captain Rick Gallagher, Mike's relationship with Lisa's partner, Dr. Ursula Morrell, and the deaths of two fishermen, Carl Davies and Sam Murray. These threads increasingly intertwine throughout the season, culminating in the final two episodes, in which it is revealed that Gallagher hired Ursula and Lisa to manufacture a deadly toxin from an unusual venomous crab that he planned to sell on the black market. The plot is thwarted, the boat carrying the poison is sunk, Gallagher is killed and Ursula's death is staged as she enters a witness protection program.

During the season, Nav and ET develop a relationship despite adversities: Chefo becomes engaged to his girlfriend; Swain's wife, Sally, gives birth; Charge reluctantly gets help for, and recovers from, an eye injury; Spider loses friend and shipmate Jaffah to a jellyfish sting; Robert comes to terms with his father's death and Lt. Daryl Smith has a mostly off-screen and implied relationship with AFP Agent Alicia Turnball.

Production
Filming for this season started on 9 October 2006 and concluded on 20 February 2007. The Pacific Film and Television Corporation offered the producers $750,000 as an incentive to film the series in Queensland.

Much of the filming was carried out of tropical Queensland on a RAN patrol boat. This boat was built to accommodate 24 people, but up to 60 members of cast and crew were aboard the small boat, and a vast catamaran was used by the wardrobe department.

 was used to film Sea Patrol.

Filming schedule:
Dunk Island (tropical island, Queensland) for eight weeks
Sydney for six weeks
Gold Coast Movie World Studios for six weeks

Casting

Main

Recurring

Episodes

Reception

Critical response
In 2007, Sea Patrol was one of the most eagerly awaited television series in Australia. The series marked Lisa McCune's return to television and the Nine Network's attempt to reclaim its former ratings.

Almost 2 million viewers watched the first episode; this was a first place in the ratings. It was the second most popular series premiere in Australian history. Sea Patrol's premiere drew a larger audience than the NRL State of Origin match broadcast the same week, a rarity for an untested local drama. Critics described the script as "...dated, unsophisticated and a little clichéd". In the Sun Herald, the television critic stated that "...the series is let down by a somewhat sinking script that fails to quickly engage". Hal McElroy was disappointed; he believed the Australian drama industry failed because of a lack of good writing and a "...fail[ure] to create stories that connected with mass audience". Another common complaint from critics was the "safety" of the story-lines. The series was developed as a 7:30 pm drama; story-lines had to be appropriate for that time-slot. These complaints lasted throughout the season. In The Daily Telegraph, for example, Sea Patrol was described as "decent but safe drama". This was not what the Nine Network had hoped from their $15 million drama.

The show was given a promising review from the Royal Australian Navy (RAN), published in Navy News, which stated that Navy personnel were glad the show did not "...embarrass the service or give false perceptions" and were also happy with the portrayal of life in the RAN. Regardless of the critical comments of Sea Patrol, Nine commissioned a second season before the first was broadcast.

While the critical response improved, ratings continued to drop throughout the season.

Ratings
The first episode of Sea Patrol was the second-highest rating series premiere, surpassing the debut of McLeod's Daughters at 1.89 million, but not the debut of Always Greener at 2.06 million, both of which were cancelled by their respective networks.

Notes

Awards
Sea Patrol was nominated for three awards at the 2008 Logie Awards. The nominees included Lisa McCune, who was nominated for Most Popular Actress and the Gold Logie for Most Popular Personality on Australian Television. David Lyons was nominated for Most Popular New Male Talent.

Home media

References

General references 
 
 
 
 

2007 Australian television seasons
Sea Patrol